Ancient religion may refer to:
Prehistoric religion
Paleolithic religion
Neolithic religion
Bronze and Iron Age religion:
Religions of the ancient Near East
Ancient Mesopotamian religion
Ancient Egyptian religion
Historical Vedic religion
Ancient Greek religion
Religion in ancient Rome
Ancient Celtic religion

See also 
History of religion
Paganism